Elizabeth Falemaka Kikkert (born 3 July 1980) is an Australian politician. She has been a Liberal member of the Australian Capital Territory Legislative Assembly since 2016, representing the electorate of Ginninderra. She was born in Tonga and was a full-time mother and volunteer before entering politics. She is also a practising member of the Church of Jesus Christ of Latter-day Saints, and she has five children.

References

1980 births
Living people
Liberal Party of Australia members of the Australian Capital Territory Legislative Assembly
Members of the Australian Capital Territory Legislative Assembly
Tongan emigrants to Australia
Australian Latter Day Saints
21st-century Australian politicians
Women members of the Australian Capital Territory Legislative Assembly
21st-century Australian women politicians